Rebecca Tyson Northen (August 24, 1910 – April 30, 2004) was an American author, educator, and conservationist known for her work on orchids.

She was recognized for popularizing orchids through her books and articles on their culture and has been referred to as the "Julia Child of Orchids". Northen made contributions to orchid conservation, including the establishment of the Lankester Garden in Costa Rica. She authored several books and articles on orchid culture, including Home Orchid Growing, which was first published in 1950.

Early life 
Rebecca Tyson Northen was born on August 24, 1910, in Detroit, Michigan. She received her bachelor's degree from Wayne State University in 1935, and her master's degree in Zoology from Mount Holyoke College in 1937.

In 1937, she married Henry Theodore Northen and they had three children together.

Career 
Northen had a lifelong interest in orchids, which began with the gift of a flask of tiny orchid seedlings. Despite the lack of information and resources on growing orchids at home, she persisted and eventually found ways to successfully cultivate them. In the late 1940s, she co-authored articles on orchid culture with her husband Henry in the Journal of the American Orchid Society. She was also known as the 'orchid lady' in letters to the editor of the Denver Post, providing tips on orchid culture.

Due to the demand for information on growing orchids at home, she wrote and published a book titled Home Orchid Growing in 1950, which provided guidance on orchid biology and their cultivation.

Rebecca Northen was a horticulturist and author who specialized in the study of orchids. She was active in the orchid community, giving presentations at international societies and publishing research in journals and co-authoring books with Henry.

In 1976, Rebecca Northen published Orchids as House Plants, a book aimed at providing guidance for growing orchids at home. She also wrote about miniature orchids, and published papers in the Journal of the American Orchid Society for beginner orchid growers.

Northen received recognition for her work in the field, including the American Orchid Society's Gold Medal of Achievement in 1979 and the Certificate of Meritorious Achievement in Orchid Education in 1999. Some orchids have been named in her honor including Clowesia Rebecca Northen, Trichoceros muralis 'Rebecca Northen', and Laelia anceps Rebecca T. Northen, and her work has been featured in exhibitions at Smithsonian Gardens and the U.S. Botanic Garden.

Conservation 
Northen studied orchids in their natural habitats by visiting different locations around the world. She also participated in efforts to establish the Lankester garden in Costa Rica, through writing articles and raising funds.

References 

Writers from Michigan
1910 births
2004 deaths
Wayne State University
Mount Holyoke College
21st-century American women